Anarsia libanoticella is a moth in the family Gelechiidae. It was described by Hans Georg Amsel in 1967. It is found in Lebanon.

References

libanoticella
Moths described in 1967
Moths of the Middle East